Spilosoma nyasana is a moth in the  family Erebidae. It was described by Rothschild in 1933. It is found in the Democratic Republic of Congo, Kenya and Malawi.

References

Natural History Museum Lepidoptera generic names catalog

Moths described in 1933
nyasana